Tom Corwin is an unincorporated community in Coal Township, Jackson County, Ohio, United States.

Tom Corwin was settled as a company town for the Tom Corwin Coal Company, which operated multiple mines in the area and shipped the coal out by means of the nearby Cincinnati, Hamilton & Dayton (CH&D) Railway.

References 

Unincorporated communities in Jackson County, Ohio